Stung may be:
 the past participle of the verb to sting; see Stinger (for animal stings), and Stinging plant
 the title of two films:
 Stung (1931 film)
 Stung (2015 film)

See also 
 
 Sting (disambiguation)